The Tour de la province de Liège (English: Tour of the Province of Liège) is a cycling race held annually in the Liège province of Belgium. Although it isn't part of UCI Europe Tour, it has been won by many famous cyclists since its creation in 1962, including Bjarne Riis, Aart Vierhouten, Koos Moerenhout, Stijn Devolder and Johan Vansummeren.

Winners

Wins by country

External  links
 

Cycle races in Belgium
Recurring sporting events established in 1962
1962 establishments in Belgium